Javelin PDF Reader is a full functionality secure PDF reader for Windows, MacOS, iOS (iPAD and iPhone) and Android OS, with support for Digital Rights Management (DRM) using encoded and encrypted PDF files in Drumlin's DRMX and DRMZ formats. PDF files that have been converted to the DRMX and DRMZ formats (using the free DrumlinPublisher software) can be protected against printing, or printing can be permitted with limits to the number times printed/pages printed, copying is disabled, date expiry of PDF files is provided (in two ways), limits on the number of times a file can be viewed is available, optional intelligent (dynamic) watermarking is provided, and usage of the files is tracked centrally. All versions of Javelin support downloadable catalogs - a form of folder structure allowing metadata, covers and other data to be downloaded and stored locally within the apps for fast access to large number of PDF or secured PDF documents.

Features 
 Viewing and printing of standard PDF files
 Viewing and printing of secured PDF files with DRM protection
 Markup and annotation of PDF and secure PDF documents
 Page insertion, deletion and extraction (Javelin3 for Windows, latest versions)

Requirements 
Supported Operating Systems: Microsoft Windows Windows 7, Windows 8, Windows 10, Windows 11; Apple Mac OS X 10.6 and later; Apple iOS 4.2 and later; Android OS 5 and later

See also 
 List of PDF software

References

External links

PDF software